The Guan Yu Statue is a large monument to Chinese deified military general Guan Yu located in Jingzhou, China. The statue was designed by Han Meilin, and finished construction in 2016. It stands at 58 metres tall, weighs 1,197 tonnes, and is made of around 4,000 bronze strips. The project began in 2013 when Han Meilin visited Jingzhou for inspiration, and personally oversaw the designing and installing of the statue.

Guan Yu is depicted wearing his traditional robes and cloak, whilst wielding his famous guandao known as the Green Dragon Crescent Blade, which weighs 123 tonnes. The figure stands atop a 10 metre pedestal, which resembles an ancient Chinese warship. Inside the base is a 7,710 square-metre museum and shrine to Guan Yu. 

The project cost 1.5 billion yuan, and was officially opened to the public on June 17th, 2016. On the day of the unveiling, activities such as worship, visiting fairs, and praying to Guan Yu were held. Han Meilin was present for the ceremony.

Background 
Guan Yu was a Chinese military general serving under the warlord Liu Bei during the late Eastern Han dynasty. His life was lionised and his achievements glorified to such an extent after his death in 220 that he was deified during the Sui dynasty. Through generations of story telling, culminating in the 14th-century historical novel Romance of the Three Kingdoms, his deeds and moral qualities have been given immense emphasis, making Guan Yu one of East Asia's most popular paradigms of loyalty and righteousness. He is still worshipped today as a bodhisattva in Buddhist tradition and as a guardian deity in Chinese folk religion and Taoism. He is also held in high esteem in Confucianism.

Slated relocation 
In September 2020, the Ministry of Housing and Urban-Rural Development criticized the Guan Yu statue as "vain and wasteful", and that its towering presence in the skyline "ruined the character and culture of Jingzhou as a historic city" and called for rectification. An investigation by the state broadcaster China Central Television revealed that the project's developers only had permission to build the pedestal of the statue (the museum). The developers, treating the statue as a piece of art, claimed to be unaware that large statues required their own planning processes, nor were they aware that the statue's current location had a height limit of 15m. Additionally, land under the statue started to sink under its weight.

In response to the central government order, Jingzhou city officials announced in October that the statue will be relocated. The new location of the statue will be 8 km away in Dianjiangtai, where Guan Yu was said to have drilled his troops. The cost of the relocation is estimated at 155 million yuan.

References 

2016 sculptures
Bronze sculptures in China
Sculptures of gods
Jingzhou
Guan Yu
Colossal statues in China
2016 establishments in China
Buildings and structures in Hubei